The Grand Illusion Cinema is the longest running independent cinema in the city of Seattle, Washington, and has become a landmark of the film community. Opened as The Movie House in March 1970  by Randy Finley at 1403 NE 50th St in a converted dentist's office the cinema became the city's first intimate arthouse and showcased foreign and revival films. The cinema's success led to Randy creating the Movie House in Portland, Oregon in 1973. He then took over the Guild 45th Theater and created the Seven Gables Theatre  at 50th and Roosevelt in Seattle. They, and other theaters, became the Seven Gables Theatre Chain, which was later merged with Landmark Theatres. The Grand Illusion was never part of the Seven Gables chain and remained a popular independent venue. Non-profit film arts organization, the Northwest Film Forum, saved the theater from closure in 1997, remodeled it, and revitalized interest in the institution.

In 2004 the cinema was sold to a group of investors including several staff members. It exists today as a completely volunteer-run, non-profit organization. The Grand Illusion shows a wide variety of films ranging from new independent and foreign films, repertory classics, documentaries, and a consistent supply of "late nights" on the weekend which feature horror, sci-fi, and exploitation films. Over the years the cinema has been host to such people as Quentin Tarantino, Takashi Miike, Alex Cox, Eddie Izzard, Stuart Gordon, Don Hertzfeldt, Dennis Nyback, and the cast of Troll 2.

In 2008, along with such seminal theatres as the Alamo Drafthouse in Austin and the Film Forum in New York, The Grand Illusion was named one of the best movie houses in America by Paste Magazine.

Notes

References

External links

Buildings and structures in Seattle
Cinemas and movie theaters in Washington (state)
Repertory cinemas